Santeshivara Lingannaiah Bhyrappa (born 20 August 1931) is an Indian novelist, philosopher and screenwriter who writes in Kannada. His work is popular in the state of Karnataka and he is widely regarded as one of modern India's popular novelists. His novels are unique in terms of theme, structure, and characterization. He has been among the top-selling authors in the Kannada language and his books have been translated into Hindi and Marathi which have also been sellers.

Bhyrappa's works do not fit into any specific genre of contemporary Kannada literature such as Navodaya, Navya, Bandaya, or Dalita, partly because of the range of topics he writes about. His major works have been at the center of several heated public debates and controversies. He was awarded the 20th Saraswati Samman in 2010. In March 2015, Bhyrappa was awarded the Sahitya Akademi Fellowship. The Government of India awarded him with the civilian honour of the Padma Shri in 2016 and the Padma Bhushan in 2023.

Biography

Early life 
He came from a traditional Hoysala Karnataka Brahmin family. He lost his mother and brothers to Bubonic plague in his early childhood and took on odd jobs to pay for his education. During his childhood, he was influenced by the writings of Gorur Ramaswamy Iyengar. His date of birth as per school records is 20 August 1931 and he has declared in his autobiography Bhitti that his actual date of birth is different. (Bhitti page no.50 First edition)

Bhyrappa completed his primary education in Channarayapatna taluk before moving to Mysore where he completed the rest of his education. In his autobiography, Bhitti (Wall) he wrote that he took a break during his high school education. Bhyrappa impulsively quit school, following his cousin's advice and wandered for a year with him. His sojourn led him to Mumbai, where he worked as a railway porter. In Mumbai he met a group of sadhus and joined them to seek spiritual solace. He wandered with them for a few months before returning to Mysore to resume his education .

Education 
Bhyrappa attended  Navodaya High School, Channarayapatna, Sharada Vilas High School, Mysore. He earned a  B.A (Hons) – Philosophy (Major), at Mysore University and earned an  M.A in Philosophy as well as being awarded the gold medal by Mysore University. He earned a  Doctor of Philosophy – Satya mattu Soundarya (Truth and Beauty) written in English, at Maharaja Sayajirao University of Baroda.

Career 
S L Bhyrappa was a Lecturer of Logic and Psychology at Sri Kadasiddheshwar College, Hubli; Sardar Patel University in Gujarat; NCERT, Delhi; and the Regional College of Education, Mysore from which he retired in 1991. Bhyrappa has two sons and lives with his wife in Mysore.

Bhyrappa' works are published in English, Kannada, and Sanskrit, and taught in Indian Studies and Western Philosophy courses.

Works 

Starting with Bheemakaya, first published in 1958, Bhyrappa has authored twenty four novels in a career spanning more than five decades. Vamshavruksha, Tabbaliyu Neenade Magane, Matadana and Nayi Neralu were made into films that received critical acclaim.  Vamshavruksha has received the Kannada Sahitya Academy Award in 1966 and Daatu (Crossing Over) received both the Kannada and the Kendra Sahitya Academy awards in 1975. Parva, the most critically acclaimed of all his novels narrates the social structure, values and mortality in the epic of Mahabharata very effectively. Bhyrappa reconstructs the Mahabharatha from sociological and anthropological angle, through metaphors in this novel. Tantu, a Kannada novel was published in 1993. Tantu ( meaning 'cord' or 'links') explored relations or links between human emotions. It was translated into English in the year 2010 by Niyogi Books. Tantu was followed by Saartha which was published in 1998.

Popularity 
Many of Bhyrappa's novels have been translated into other Indian languages and English. Bhyrappa has been one of the best-selling authors in Kannada for the past twenty-five years, and translations of his books have been best sellers for the past eight years in Marathi and in the past five years in Hindi.

Most of his novels have been reprinted several times. His recently printed novel Aavarana, was sold out even before its release. The novel went on to create a record in Indian literary circles with ten reprints within five months of its publication. His  novel Yaana (Journey), was released in August 2014. In 2017 his latest novel UttaraKaanda based on the hindu epic Ramayana was published. Bhyrappa announced that this novel will be his last novel and due to adavnced age he cannot undertake any new ventures. After a long gap of 62 years his second novel Belaku Mooditu was published in 2021.

All of his novels are published by Sahitya Bhandara in Bengaluru, Karnataka.

Controversies 
Bhyrappa was the center of several controversies because of his themes and positions on sensitive issues. Some of his prominent novels (such as Vamshavruksha, Tabbaliyu Neenaade Magane, Parva, and Saartha) have strong roots in ancient Indian philosophical tradition, thus inviting severe criticism from Navya writers and from others. Bhyrappa supported N. R. Narayana Murthy when he was criticized by the media and the public regarding the controversy over playing an instrumental version of the national anthem at an important occasion. He also backed N. R. Narayana Murthy regarding the Kaveri issue saying riots and protests are not going to solve the problem. Bhyrappa had a debate with Girish Karnad in the publication Vijaya Karnataka regarding the religious tolerance of 18th century Mysore ruler Tippu Sultan. In Bhyrappa's novel Aavarana, he accuses Tippu Sultan of being a religious fanatic who could not stand Hindus in his court. Bhyrappa had substantiated the argument based on several historic sources written in India during Tippu Sultan's rule. One of the issues Bhyrappa raised was the usage of the Persian word bin (which is used to refer to a person as a "son of") in the Government of Karnataka records even during modern times. This practice started during Tippu Sultan's rule, which according to Bhyrappa was one of the several methods used to enforce Islamic rule on Hindus. The book discusses other methods used by Tippu Sultan to convert Hindus to Islam. Bhyrappa backs his claims with historical references. This was criticized by Girish Karnad, who portrays Tippu Sultan as a secular ruler in his plays. Bhyrappa accused Karnad of giving an inaccurate account of Tippu Sultan in his plays.

U.R. Ananthamurthy was a prominent critic of Bhyrappa's novels. Bhyrappa has documented his debate with Ananthamurthy in Bhitti, as well as in a few essays in his book Naaneke Bareyuttene. Bhyrappa's more recent novel Aavarana brings out historical information about what Islamic rule did to ancient Indian social and cultural life. This has stirred a major controversy. There have been accusations leveled at Bhyrappa of being a Hindu fundamentalist who wants to divide society on the basis of history, an allegation which Bhyrappa anticipated and tried to refute by referring to notable sources. Ananthamurthy criticized Bhyrappa and his works, calling Aavarana "dangerous". Ananthamurthy accused Bhyrappa of being more of a debater than a storyteller. "He doesn't know what Hindu religion stands for" and "does not know how to write novels". However Bhyrappa claims that the novel was result of his search for truth and there was no ulterior motive behind the novel. He urged critics to study the reference books mentioned in the novel before arriving at any conclusion about it.

Accolades

National awards 
 Padma Bhushan award (Government of India, 2023)
 Bendre National award 
 Padma Shri award (Government of India, 2016)
 Sahitya Akademi Fellowship (Government of India, 2015)
 National Research Professor, (Government of India, 2014)
 Saraswati Samman for his novel Mandra (Birla Foundation, 2011).
 Sahitya Akademi Award  (Government of India, 1975)

State awards 
 Honorary Doctorate from Central University of Karnataka (2020)
 Nrupatunga Award (2017, Kannada Sahitya Parishath and BMTC Bengaluru)
 Sri Krishnadevaraya Award (Telugu Vignana Samithi, 2017) 
 Honorary Doctorate from Mysore University (2015).
 Betageri Krishna Sharma Award (2014)
 Vagvilasini Puraskar (Deenanath Memorial Foundation, Pune, 2012)
 Nadoja Award (2011)
 NTR National Literary Award (2007)
 Honorary Doctorate from Gulbarga University (2007).
 Pampa Award (2005).
 President, Kannada Sahitya Sammelana at Kanakapura (1999)
 Kannada Sahitya Academy award (Government of Karnataka, 1966)

Bibliography

Novels 

 Gatha Janma Matteradu Kathegalu (1955) 
 Bheemakaaya (1958)
 Belaku Mooditu (1959)
 Dharmashree (1961)
 Doora saridaru (1962)
 Matadana (1965)
 Vamshavriksha  (1965)
 Jalapaata (1967)
 Naayi Neralu (1968)
 Tabbaliyu Neenade Magane (1968)
 Gruhabhanga (1970)
 Nirakarana (1971)
 Grahana (1972)
 Daatu (1973)
 Anveshana (1976)
 Parva1979)
 Nele (1983)
 Sakshi(1986)
 Anchu (1990)
 Tantu (1993)
 Saartha (1998)
 Mandra (2001)
 Aavarana (2007)
 Kavalu (2010)
 Yaana (2014)
 Uttarakaanda (2017)

Autobiography 
 Bhitti (1996)

Criticism 
 Satya mattu Soundarya (1966) (Doctoral thesis)
 Saahitya mattu Prateeka (1967)
 Kathe mattu Kathavastu (1969)
 Naaneke Bareyuttene? (1980)
 Sandarbha : Samvada (2011)
 Saakshi Parva (2019)

Short stories
His short story "Avva" was published in the Kasturi magazine and it's considered as his maiden short story.

Translations 

 Dharmashree              : Sanskrit, Marathi
 Vamshavruksha            : Telugu, Marathi, Hindi, Urdu, English
 Nayi-Neralu              : Gujarati, Hindi
 Tabbaliyu Neenade Magane : Hindi
 Gruhabhanga              : All 14 scheduled languages of India, English
 Nirakarana               : Hindi
 Daatu                    : All 14 scheduled languages of India, English
 Anveshana                : Marathi, Hindi
 Parva                    : Telugu, Marathi, Hindi, Bengali, Tamil, English
 Nele                     : Hindi
 Sakshi                   : Hindi, English
 Anchu                    : Marathi, Hindi,English
 Tantu                    : Marathi, Hindi
 Sartha                   : Sanskrit, Marathi, Hindi, English
 Aavarana                 : Sanskrit, Marathi, Hindi, Tamil, English
 Naneke Bareyuttene       : Marathi, English
 Satya mattu Soundarya    : English
 Bhitti                   : Marathi, Hindi, English
 Mandra                   : Marathi, Hindi, English

Visual Media

Films
 Vamshavruksha (1972)
 Tabbaliyu Neenade Magane (1977)
 Matadana (2001)
 Nayi-Neralu (2006)

Television series
 Gruhabhanga
 Daatu (Hindi)

See also 
 Kannada literature

Footnotes

References 
 Bhitti (Canvas) by S.L. Bhyrappa, an autobiography
 Naaneke Bareyuttene by S.L. Bhyrappa, a collection of essays about writing
 S. L. Bhyrappa Badaku-Baraha by Nagaraj Neeragunda on S.L. Bhyrappa's life and works

External Links and Further Reading 

 Interview with S L Bhyrappa – Times of India

1931 births
Living people
20th-century Indian male writers
20th-century Indian novelists
20th-century Indian philosophers
Indian male novelists
Indian male screenwriters
Kannada screenwriters
Kannada-language writers
Maharaja Sayajirao University of Baroda alumni
Novelists from Karnataka
People from Hassan district
Recipients of the Padma Shri in literature & education
Recipients of the Sahitya Akademi Award in Kannada
Screenwriters from Karnataka
Writers from Mysore
Indian Hindus
Recipients of the Padma Bhushan in literature & education